The Misa is a river in the Marche region of Italy. It runs for over 48 kilometres through the region. The source of the river lies south of Arcevia in the province of Ancona. The river flows northeast near Serra de' Conti, Ostra Vetere and Ostra. The river is joined by the Nevola before entering the Adriatic Sea near Senigallia.

References

Rivers of the Province of Ancona
Rivers of Italy
Adriatic Italian coast basins